John Mossop (born 14 June 1959) is a former Australian rules footballer in the Victorian Football League for Geelong Football Club and North Melbourne. He wore the number 10 during his tenure at Geelong and played often in the ruck position. Mossop was awarded the Carji Greeves Medal in 1982.

References

External links

1959 births
Carji Greeves Medal winners
Geelong Football Club players
Living people
North Melbourne Football Club players
Australian rules footballers from South Australia
Victorian State of Origin players